This is a list of  plants in the genus Melaleuca. In 2013, Lyndley Craven published a monograph of the genus with a description of 290 species, including about 40 sometimes known as callistemons. A new species (Melaleuca lophocoracorum) was described in a 2013 paper. Craven's inclusion of callistemons in Melaleuca is not accepted by the National Herbarium of New South Wales or by the Royal Botanic Gardens, Melbourne but is accepted by the Royal Botanic Gardens, Kew. For example, Melaleuca brachyandra is recognised in the World Checklist of Selected Plant Families but as Callistemon brachyandrus by the National Herbarium of New South Wales and by the Royal Botanic Gardens, Melbourne.
 
Most melaleucas are endemic to Australia but a few species occur in parts of Malesia and Southeast Asia, and 7 species (marked *) are endemic to New Caledonia.

 Melaleuca acacioides  F.Muell.  - coastal paperbark
 Melaleuca acerosa - see Melaleuca systena  Craven 
 Melaleuca acuminata F.Muell.  - mallee honeymyrtle
 Melaleuca acutifolia (Benth.) Craven & Lepschi 
 Melaleuca adenostyla K.J.Cowley 
 Melaleuca adnata Turcz. 
 Melaleuca agathosmoides C.A.Gardner 
 Melaleuca alsophila Benth.  - saltwater paperbark
 Melaleuca alternifolia  (Maiden & Betche) Cheel - narrow-leaved paperbark
 Melaleuca amydra Craven 
 Melaleuca apodocephala Turcz. 
 Melaleuca apostiba K.J.Cowley 
 Melaleuca araucarioides Barlow 
 Melaleuca arcana S.T.Blake  
 Melaleuca argentea W.Fitzg.  - silver cajuput, silver-leaved paperbark
 Melaleuca armillaris  (Gaertn.) Sm.   - bracelet honeymyrtle
 Melaleuca aspalathoides Schauer 
 Melaleuca atroviridis Craven & Lepschi
 Melaleuca barlowii Craven  
 Melaleuca basicephala Benth.  
 Melaleuca beardii Craven  
 Melaleuca biconvexa Byrnes 
 Melaleuca bisulcata F.Muell. 
 Melaleuca blaeriifolia Turcz. 
 Melaleuca boeophylla Craven  
 Melaleuca borealis Craven 
 Melaleuca brachyandra (Lindl.) Craven  (=Callistemon brachyandrus) - prickly bottlebrush
 Melaleuca bracteata  F.Muell.  - black teatree, river teatree, mock olive
 Melaleuca bracteosa  Turcz. 
 Melaleuca brevifolia Turcz.  - mallee honey-myrtle
 Melaleuca brevisepala *  (J.W.Dawson) Craven & J.W.Dawson 
 Melaleuca bromelioides Barlow 
 Melaleuca brongniartii * Daeniker 
 Melaleuca brophyi Craven  
 Melaleuca buseana * (Guillaumin) Craven & J.W.Dawson 
 Melaleuca caeca Craven  
 Melaleuca cajuputi Powell  cajuput or white samet
 Melaleuca calcicola (Barlow ex Craven) Craven & Lepschi
 Melaleuca calothamnoides F.Muell. 
 Melaleuca calycina R.Br. 
 Melaleuca calyptroides Craven  
 Melaleuca campanae Craven  
 Melaleuca camptoclada Quinn 
 Melaleuca capitata Cheel 
 Melaleuca cardiophylla  F.Muell.  - umbrella bush, tangling melaleuca
 Melaleuca carrii Craven  
 Melaleuca cheelii C.T.White 
 Melaleuca chisholmii (Cheel) Craven  (=Callistemon chisholmii) - Burra bottlebrush
 Melaleuca ciliosa Turcz. 
 Melaleuca citrina  (Curtis) Dum.Cours.  (=Callistemon citrinus) - crimson bottlebrush
 Melaleuca citrolens Barlow 
 Melaleuca clarksonii Barlow 
 Melaleuca clavifolia Craven  
 Melaleuca cliffortioides Diels 
 Melaleuca coccinea  A.S.George  - goldfields bottlebrush
 Melaleuca comboynensis (Cheel) Craven  (=Callistemon comboynensis) - cliff bottlebrush
 Melaleuca concinna Turcz. 
 Melaleuca concreta F.Muell. 
 Melaleuca condylosa  Craven 
 Melaleuca conothamnoides C.A.Gardner 
 Melaleuca cordata Turcz. 
 Melaleuca cornucopiae Byrnes 
 Melaleuca coronicarpa D.A.Herb.  (See Melaleuca marginata)
 Melaleuca croxfordiae Craven 
 Melaleuca ctenoides Quinn 
 Melaleuca cucullata Turcz. 
 Melaleuca cuticularis Labill.  - saltwater paperbark
 Melaleuca dawsonii * Craven 
 Melaleuca dealbata S.T.Blake   - karnbor, swamp teatree, soapy teatree 
 Melaleuca deanei F.Muell. 
 Melaleuca decora (Salisb.) Britten  white feather honeymyrtle
 Melaleuca decussata R.Br.  - totem poles, cross-leaved honey-myrtle
 Melaleuca delta Craven 
 Melaleuca dempta (Barlow) Craven  
 Melaleuca densa R.Br. 
 Melaleuca densispicata Byrnes 
 Melaleuca depauperata Turcz. 
 Melaleuca depressa Diels 
 Melaleuca dichroma Craven & Lepschi (formerly Melaleuca virgata)
 Melaleuca diosmatifolia Dum.Cours.  (sometimes known as Melaleuca erubescens)
 Melaleuca diosmifolia Andrews 
 Melaleuca dissitiflora F.Muell.  - creek teatree
 Melaleuca eleuterostachya F.Muell. 
 Melaleuca elliptica  Labill.  - granite bottlebrush 
 Melaleuca ericifolia Sm.  - swamp paperbark
 Melaleuca eulobata Craven 
 Melaleuca eurystoma Barlow ex Craven 
 Melaleuca eximia (K.J.Cowley) Craven  
 Melaleuca exuvia Craven 
 Melaleuca fabri Craven 
 Melaleuca faucicola Craven   (= Callistemon pauciflorus) - desert bottlebrush
 Melaleuca ferruginea Craven & Cowie 
 Melaleuca filifolia  F.Muell.  - wiry honeymyrtle
 Melaleuca fissurata Barlow 
 Melaleuca flammea Craven  (=Callistemon acuminatus) - tapering-leaved bottlebrush
 Melaleuca flavovirens (Cheel) Craven  (=Callistemon flavovirens) - green bottlebrush
 Melaleuca fluviatilis Barlow 
 Melaleuca foliolosa A.Cunn. ex Benth. 
 Melaleuca formosa (S.T.Blake) Craven  (=Callistemon formosus, C. speciosus) - Kingaroy bottlebrush
 Melaleuca fulgens  R.Br.   - scarlet honeymyrtle
 Melaleuca genialis Lepschi 
 Melaleuca gibbosa Labill.  - slender honey-myrtle, small-leaved honey-myrtle
 Melaleuca glaberrima F.Muell. 
 Melaleuca glauca (Sweet) Craven   (=Callistemon glaucus) - Albany bottlebrush
 Melaleuca glena Craven 
 Melaleuca globifera R.Br. 
 Melaleuca glomerata F.Muell.  - desert honey-myrtle
 Melaleuca gnidiifolia  Vent.  (See Melaleuca thymifolia  Sm. )
 Melaleuca gnidioides * Brongn. and Gris 
 Melaleuca grieveana Craven 
 Melaleuca groveana Cheel & C.T.White  - Grove's paperbark
 Melaleuca halmaturorum  F.Muell.  ex Miq.   - kangaroo honey-myrtle 
 Melaleuca halophila Craven 
 Melaleuca hamata Fielding & Gardner  
 Melaleuca hamulosa Turcz. 
 Melaleuca haplantha Barlow 
 Melaleuca hemisticta S.T.Blake ex Craven  (=Callistemon hemistictus) - Mount Wheeler bottlebrush
 Melaleuca hnatiukii Craven 
 Melaleuca hollidayi Craven 
 Melaleuca holosericea Schauer  
 Melaleuca howeana Cheel  - Lord Howe Island teatree
 Melaleuca huegelii  Endl.   - chenille honeymyrtle
 Melaleuca huttensis Craven 
 Melaleuca hypericifolia Sm.  - hillock bush
 Melaleuca idana Craven 
 Melaleuca incana  R.Br.  - grey honeymyrtle
 Melaleuca interioris Craven & Lepschi  
 Melaleuca irbyana R.T.Baker  - weeping paperbark
 Melaleuca johnsonii Craven 
 Melaleuca keigheryi Craven 
 Melaleuca kunzeoides Byrnes 
 Melaleuca laetifica Craven 
 Melaleuca lanceolata  Otto  - Rottnest tea tree, black paperbark, moonah
 Melaleuca lara Craven  
 Melaleuca lasiandra F.Muell. 
 Melaleuca lateralis Turcz. 
 Melaleuca lateriflora Benth.  - gorada
 Melaleuca lateritia  A.Dietr.  - robin redbreast bush
 Melaleuca laxiflora  Turcz.  
 Melaleuca lazaridis  Craven  (= Callistemon lazaridis)
 Melaleuca lecanantha Barlow 
 Melaleuca leiocarpa F.Muell. 
 Melaleuca leiopyxis Benth. 
 Melaleuca leptospermoides Schauer 
 Melaleuca leucadendra  (L.) L.  - weeping paperbark, long-leaved paperbark, white paperbark
 Melaleuca leuropoma Craven  
 Melaleuca linariifolia  Sm.  - snow-in-summer, narrow-leaved paperbark, budjur
 Melaleuca linearifolia  (Link) Craven 
 Melaleuca linearis  Schrad. & J.C.Wendl.  (= Callistemon linearis, C. pinifolius, C. rigidus)
 Melaleuca linguiformis Craven 
 Melaleuca linophylla F.Muell. 
 Melaleuca longistaminea (F.Muell.) Barlow ex. Craven  
 Melaleuca lophocoracorum A.J.Ford, Craven & Brophy  
 Melaleuca lutea Craven 
 Melaleuca macronychia Turcz. 
 Melaleuca manglesii Schauer  
 Melaleuca marginata (Sond.) Hislop, Lepschi & Craven  (formerly Melaleuca coronicarpa)
 Melaleuca megacephala F.Muell. 
 Melaleuca megalongensis Craven & S.M.Douglas  (= Callistemon megalongensis) - Megalong Valley bottlebrush
 Melaleuca micromera Schauer  wattle honeymyrtle
 Melaleuca microphylla Sm. 
 Melaleuca minutifolia  F.Muell.  - teatree 
 Melaleuca monantha (K.J.Cowley) Craven 
 Melaleuca montana (S.T.Blake) Craven  (= Callistemon montanus) - mountain bottlebrush
 Melaleuca montis-zamia Craven  (= Callistemon montis-zamiae)
 Melaleuca nanophylla Carrick  dwarf-leaved honey-myrtle
 Melaleuca nematophylla F.Muell. ex Craven   - wiry honeymyrtle

 Melaleuca nervosa  (Lindl.) Cheel  (= Callistemon nervosus) - fibrebark
 Melaleuca nesophila  F.Muell.  - mindiyed, showy honey-myrtle,
 Melaleuca nodosa (Sol. ex Gaertn.) Sm.  - prickly-leaved paperbark
 Melaleuca ochroma Lepschi 
 Melaleuca oldfieldii F.Muell. ex Benth.
 Melaleuca orbicularis Craven 
 Melaleuca ordinifolia Barlow 
 Melaleuca orophila Craven  (= Callistemon teretifolius) - needle bottlebrush, Flinders Ranges bottlebrush
 Melaleuca osullivanii Craven & Lepschi  
 Melaleuca oxyphylla Carrick  - pointed-leaved honey-myrtle
 Melaleuca pachyphylla (Cheel) Craven  (= Callistemon pachyphyllus) - wallum bottlebrush
 Melaleuca pallescens Byrnes 
 Melaleuca pallida (Bonpl.) Craven  (= Callistemon pallidus) - lemon bottlebrush
 Melaleuca paludicola Craven  (= Callistemon paludosus, Callistemon sieberi) - river bottlebrush
 Melaleuca pancheri  * (Brongn. & Griseb.) Craven & J.W.Dawson 
 Melaleuca papillosa Craven 
 Melaleuca parviceps Lindl.  - rough honey-myrtle
 Melaleuca parvistaminea Byrnes 
 Melaleuca pauciflora Turcz. 
 Melaleuca pauperiflora  F.Muell.  - Boree
 Melaleuca pearsonii  (R.D.Spencer & Lumley) Craven  (= Callistemon pearsonii) - Blackdown bottlebrush
 Melaleuca penicula (K.J.Cowley) Craven  
 Melaleuca pentagona Labill. 
 Melaleuca phoenicea (Lindl.) Craven  (= Callistemon phoeniceus) - scarlet bottlebrush, lesser bottlebrush
 Melaleuca phoidophylla Craven 
 Melaleuca phratra Craven  (= Callistemon phratra)
 Melaleuca pityoides (F.Muell.) Craven 
 Melaleuca platycalyx Diels 
 Melaleuca plumea  Craven 
 Melaleuca podiocarpa Craven 
 Melaleuca polandii (F.M.Bailey) Craven  (= Callistemon polandii) – gold-tipped bottlebrush
 Melaleuca polycephala Benth. 
 Melaleuca pomphostoma Barlow 
 Melaleuca preissiana  Schauer  - stout paperbark, modong or moonah
 Melaleuca pritzelii (Domin) Barlow  
 Melaleuca procera Craven 
 Melaleuca protrusa Craven & Lepschi
 Melaleuca psammophila Diels 
 Melaleuca pulchella  R.Br.  - claw flower
 Melaleuca pungens Schauer  
 Melaleuca punicea Byrnes 
 Melaleuca pustulata Hook.f.  - yellow, warty or Cranbrook paperbark
 Melaleuca pyramidalis Craven   (= Callistemon pyramidalis)
 Melaleuca quadrifaria F.Muell.  - limestone honey-myrtle
 Melaleuca quercina Craven  (= Callistemon quercinus) - Oakey bottlebrush
 Melaleuca quinquenervia  (Cav.) S.T.Blake  – niaouli, broad-leaved paperbark
 Melaleuca radula  Lindl.  - graceful honeymyrtle
 Melaleuca recurva  (R.D.Spencer & Lumley) Craven  (= Callistemon recurvus) - Tinaroo bottlebrush
 Melaleuca rhaphiophylla  Schauer   - swamp paperbark
 Melaleuca rigidifolia Turcz.  
 Melaleuca ringens Barlow 
 Melaleuca rugulosa (Schltdl. ex Link) Craven  (= Callistemon macropunctatus, C. rugulosus, C. coccineus) - scarlet bottlebrush
 Melaleuca ryeae Craven 
 Melaleuca sabrina Craven  (= Callistemon sabrina)
 Melaleuca salicina Craven  (= Callistemon salignus) - white or willow bottlebrush
 Melaleuca saligna Schauer 
 Melaleuca sapientes Craven  
 Melaleuca scabra  R.Br.  - rough honeymyrtle
 Melaleuca scalena Craven & Lepschi  
 Melaleuca sciotostyla  Barlow  - Wongan melaleuca
 Melaleuca sclerophylla Diels  
 Melaleuca sculponeata Barlow  
 Melaleuca seriata Lindl. 
 Melaleuca sericea Byrnes 
 Melaleuca serpentina Craven  (= Callistemon serpentinus)
 Melaleuca sheathiana W.Fitzg.  - boree
 Melaleuca shiressii (Blakely) Craven  (= Callistemon shiressii)
 Melaleuca sieberi Schauer 
 Melaleuca similis Craven 
 Melaleuca societatis Craven 
 Melaleuca sophisma Lepschi 
 Melaleuca sparsiflora Turcz. 
 Melaleuca spathulata Schauer 
 Melaleuca spectabilis  (Barlow ex Craven) Craven & Lepschi
 Melaleuca sphaerodendra * Craven & J.W.Dawson 
 Melaleuca spicigera S.Moore 
 Melaleuca squamea Labill.  - swamp honeymyrtle
 Melaleuca squamophloia (Byrnes) Craven 
 Melaleuca squarrosa  Donn ex Sm.  - scented paperbark
 Melaleuca stenostachya S.T.Blake  - fibre-barked or straight teatree
 Melaleuca stereophloia Craven  
 Melaleuca stipitata (K.J.Cowley) Craven 
 Melaleuca stramentosa Craven 
 Melaleuca striata Labill. 
 Melaleuca strobophylla Barlow 
 Melaleuca styphelioides  Sm.  - prickly-leaved paperbark
 Melaleuca subalaris Barlow  
 Melaleuca suberosa  (Schauer) C.A.Gardner   - corky honeymyrtle
 Melaleuca subfalcata Turcz. 
 Melaleuca subtrigona Schauer 
 Melaleuca subulata (Cheel) Craven  (= Callistemon subulatus)
 Melaleuca sylvana (K.J.Cowley) Craven 
 Melaleuca systena Craven  - coastal honeymyrtle
 Melaleuca tamariscina Hook.  - bush-house paperbark or tamarix honey-myrtle
 Melaleuca teretifolia  Endl.  - banbar
 Melaleuca teuthidoides Barlow 
 Melaleuca thapsina Craven 
 Melaleuca thymifolia Sm.  - thyme honey-myrtle
 Melaleuca thymoides Labill. 
 Melaleuca thyoides Turcz.  - salt lake honey-myrtle 
 Melaleuca tinkeri Craven 
 Melaleuca torquata Barlow 
 Melaleuca tortifolia Byrnes 
 Melaleuca trichophylla Lindl. 
 Melaleuca trichostachya Lindl.  
 Melaleuca triumphalis Craven
 Melaleuca tuberculata Schauer 
 Melaleuca ulicoides  Craven & Lepschi 
 Melaleuca uncinata  R.Br.  - broom bush, broom honeymyrtle
 Melaleuca undulata  Benth.  - hidden honeymyrtle
 Melaleuca urceolaris F.Muell. ex Benth. 
 Melaleuca uxorum Craven G.Holmes & Sankowsky 
 Melaleuca venusta Craven 
 Melaleuca villosisepala Craven 
 Melaleuca viminalis  (Sol. ex Gaertn.) Byrnes  (= Callistemon viminalis) - weeping or creek bottlebrush
 Melaleuca viminea  Lindl.  - mohan
 Melaleuca vinnula Craven & Lepschi  
 Melaleuca violacea Schauer 
 Melaleuca virens  Craven  (= Callistemon viridiflorus) - lime bottlebrush
 Melaleuca virgata (Benth.) Craven  (See Melaleuca dichroma)
 Melaleuca viridiflora  Gaertn.  - broad-leaved paperbark 
 Melaleuca williamsii Craven  (= Callistemon pungens)
 Melaleuca wilsonii F.Muell.  - Wilson's or violet honey-myrtle
 Melaleuca wimmerensis (Marriott & G.W.Carr) Craven  (= Callistemon wimmerensis) - Wimmera bottlebrush
 Melaleuca wonganensis Craven 
 Melaleuca xerophila Barlow 
 Melaleuca zeteticorum Craven & Lepschi
 Melaleuca zonalis Craven

References

Melaleuca species
Melaleuca